Patrick Gerard Wilson (c. 1933 – 25/26 June 1973) was an Irish nationalist politician in Northern Ireland who was murdered by the loyalist Ulster Freedom Fighters (UFF).

Wilson was born in Fleet Street in Sailortown, Belfast, the youngest of seven children in a Catholic nationalist family. He and his wife Bridget had one son, Paul. He was elected as a Republican Labour Party member of the Senate of Northern Ireland in 1969. The following year, he became a founder member of the Social Democratic and Labour Party, and its first General Secretary. He was also a Belfast City Councillor.

On 26 June 1973, Wilson (aged 39) and his companion, Irene Andrews (aged 29), a Protestant, were found dead. They had been stabbed to death. Wilson's throat was cut. He was interred in Belfast's Milltown Cemetery. Loyalist John White was later convicted for his part in the murders.

See also
Paddy Wilson and Irene Andrews killings

References

1930s births
1973 deaths
Politicians from Belfast
Republican Labour Party members of the Senate of Northern Ireland
Social Democratic and Labour Party members of the Senate of Northern Ireland
Assassinated politicians from Northern Ireland
Members of the Senate of Northern Ireland 1969–1973
People killed by the Ulster Defence Association
Members of Belfast City Council
Deaths by blade weapons
Date of birth missing